The 2019 FIBA U18 European Championship was the 36th edition of the FIBA U18 European Championship. The competition took place in Volos, Greece, from 27 July to 4 August 2019.

Participating teams
 

 
 (Automatically qualified as host)

 

 
  (Winners, 2018 FIBA U18 European Championship Division B)

  (Runners-up, 2018 FIBA U18 European Championship Division B)

Venues

Preliminary round
The draw ceremony was held on 13 December 2018 in Belgrade, Serbia.

Group A

Group B

Group C

Group D

Final round

Bracket

Round of 16

9th–16th place quarterfinals

Quarterfinals

13th–16th place semifinals

9th–12th place semifinals

5th–8th place semifinals

Semifinals

15th place game

13th place game

11th place game

9th place game

7th place game

5th place game

3rd place game

Final

Final standings

Awards

All-Tournament Team
 PG –  Žiga Samar 
 SG –  Nikos Rogkavopoulos
 SF –  Santiago Aldama (MVP)
 PF –  Usman Garuba
 C –  Alperen Şengün

See also
2019 FIBA U18 European Championship Division B
2019 FIBA U18 European Championship Division C

References

External links
FIBA official website

FIBA U18 European Championship
2019–20 in European basketball
2019–20 in Greek basketball
International youth basketball competitions hosted by Greece
Sport in Volos
FIBA U18
July 2019 sports events in Europe
August 2019 sports events in Europe